Bernard Francis Sliger (September 30, 1924 – October 10, 2007) was an American educator and economist. He served as president of Florida State University for 15 years, from 1976 to 1991.

References

1924 births
2007 deaths
Presidents of Florida State University
People from Chassell, Michigan
Economists from Michigan
20th-century American economists
20th-century American academics
Michigan State University alumni